Anderson Vilien (born 31 December 1971) is a Haitian sprinter. He competed in the men's 200 metres at the 1996 Summer Olympics.

References

1971 births
Living people
Athletes (track and field) at the 1996 Summer Olympics
Haitian male sprinters
Olympic athletes of Haiti
Place of birth missing (living people)